Qaryat al Misḩak (قرية المسحك) is a village in Saladin Province, Iraq that overlooks the banks of the Tigris River.

References

Populated places in Saladin Governorate